Outpunk enjoys the distinction of being the first record label entirely devoted to queer punk bands.

The label was run out of San Francisco and began as an extension of  Matt Wobensmith's fanzine, Outpunk. Outpunk ran for seven issues, from 1992 till 1997, with contributions from queer punks such as Anonymous Boy, interviews with queercore bands and a split issue with Gary Fembot. He released two records in 1992, the 7" single compilations There's A Faggot In The Pit  and There's A Dyke In The Pit. At this time there were few actual queercore bands in existence, so some of the artists that appeared were politically motivated punk bands that supported the queercore movement.  There's A Dyke In The Pit features Bikini Kill, Lucy Stoners, 7 Year Bitch and the first song released by Tribe 8, stalwarts of the queercore scene. Outpunk's next compilation was the Outpunk Dance Party compilation LP/CD, which introduced many new queer bands to the public. Among them was Randy 'Biscuit' Turner of Big Boys new band Swine King, Pansy Division, Sister George, Sta-Prest and Mukilteo Fairies.

After this, Outpunk began to release many singles and LPs by queercore artists from the US, Canada and UK. Wobensmith was also writing a column for Maximum RocknRoll zine, which extended the range of people being introduced to queer punk music while addressing issues such as homophobia in the punk community.

In DIY: The Rise Of Lo-Fi Culture, Amy Spencer writes, "Matt Wobensmith...feels that a person's self-identification as gay shouldn't form the basis of their whole personality. 'Gay people often sacrifice the cultures they come from just to belong to something.' This sacrifice of a radical culture, whether as an artist, punk or anarchist, is what the queercore movement has always battled against."

Wobensmith ended the label in the late 90s, and began a new label called Queercorps, which was short-lived. He spoke about the reasons behind this in an interview included in the book We Owe You Nothing: Punk Planet, The Collected Interviews, edited by Daniel Sinker, originally appearing in Punk Planet zine.
Subsequently he ran the label A.C.R.O.N.Y.M., which specialized in gay hip hop music acts. Outpunk records and CDs are much sought after by collectors, since most were produced in limited runs and are rare and hard to find.

As of 2009, he runs the vintage zine store Goteblüd in San Francisco.

Artists 
 7 Year Bitch
 Behead the Prophet, No Lord Shall Live
 Bikini Kill
 CWA
 Cypher in the Snow
 Fifth Column
 God Is My Co-Pilot
 Lucy Stoners
 Mukilteo Fairies
 The Need
 Pansy Division
 Sister George
 Sta-Prest
 Swine King
 Team Dresch
 Tribe 8

See also 
 List of record labels

References

External links 
 Interview with Matt Wobensmith
 Ashcan Magazines spotlight on Goteblud & Matt Wobensmith
 Outpunk Records Showcase Concert Poster

Record labels established in 1992
Record labels disestablished in 1997
American independent record labels
LGBT-related record labels
Fanzines
Zines
Queercore record labels
Punk record labels
Riot grrrl